Sheikh Allauddin is a Pakistani politician  who has been a member of the Provincial Assembly Of Punjab since August 2018.Previously, He was a Member of the Provincial Assembly of the Punjab, from 2005 to May 2018 and from August 2018 to January 2023. He is chairman of Ravi Group of Companies.

Early life and education
He was born on 1 August 1947 in Karnal district, India.

He has a degree of Master of Arts (in Political Science where he obtained in 1970 from University of the Punjab.

Political career
He was elected to the Provincial Assembly of the Punjab as a candidate of Pakistan Muslim League (Q) (PML-Q) from Constituency PP-181 (Kasur-VII) in 2005.

He was re-elected to the Provincial Assembly of the Punjab as a candidate of PML-Q from Constituency PP-181 (Kasur-VII) in 2008 Pakistani general election.

He was re-elected to the Provincial Assembly of the Punjab as a candidate of Pakistan Muslim League (N) (PML-N) from Constituency PP-181 (Kasur-VII) in 2013 Pakistani general election. In November 2016, he was inducted into the Punjab provincial cabinet of Chief Minister Shehbaz Sharif and was made Provincial Minister of Punjab for Industries, Commerce and Investment.

He was re-elected to Provincial Assembly of the Punjab as a candidate of PML-N from Constituency PP-178 (Kasur-V) in 2018 Pakistani general election.

Wealth
In 2019, he was found to be the richest member of the Punjab Assembly with assets worth Rs1.57 billion.

References

Living people
Punjabi people
Punjab MPAs 2013–2018
1947 births
Pakistan Muslim League (N) MPAs (Punjab)
Punjab MPAs 2002–2007
Punjab MPAs 2008–2013
Punjab MPAs 2018–2023